Bruno Landry is a Québécois comedian and humorist. He was part of the humor group Rock et Belles Oreilles from 1981 to 1995.

References

External links

1959 births
Living people
French Quebecers
Canadian male television actors
Comedians from Quebec
Male actors from Quebec
Canadian sketch comedians
Place of birth missing (living people)